(also ) is a brewery owned by  and located in Stuttgart, Germany. The company owns the largest brewery in the German state of Baden-Württemberg.

Products 

The  brand consists of eight different types of beer.

 , a bottom-fermented, unfiltered lager.
 Original, a bottom-fermented beer.
 , a bottom-fermented .
 , a bottom-fermented pilsner.
 , a bottom-fermented dark beer (Dunkel).
 , a bottom-fermented Helles.
 , an unfiltered wheat beer.
 , a bottom-fermented export beer.

 uses flip-top bottles incorporating a re-sealable porcelain stopper held in place by metal clasps to pressure seal the beer bottles.

References

Breweries in Germany
Breweries in Baden-Württemberg
Manufacturing companies based in Stuttgart